Nareh is a village in Kohurestan Rural District, in the Central District of Khamir County, Hormozgan Province, Iran. At the 2006 census, its population was 373, in 78 families.

References 

Populated places in Khamir County